The 1941 Rutgers Queensmen football team represented Rutgers University in the 1941 college football season. In their fourth season under head coach Harvey Harman, the Queensmen compiled a 7–2 record and outscored their opponents 174 to 85. The team's two losses were against Syracuse (7–49) and Lafayette (0–16).

In February 1942, following the Japanese attack on Pearl Harbor, Rutgers head coach Harman, who had led the team to a 26–7–1 record from 1938 to 1941, joined the United States Navy. Harman missed the 1942 to 1945 seasons due to military service.

Schedule

References

Rutgers
Rutgers Scarlet Knights football seasons
Rutgers Queensmen football